The following lists events that happened during 1976 in Laos.

Incumbents
President: Souphanouvong 
Prime Minister: Kaysone Phomvihane

Events

September
September - Lao Airlines is established.

References

 
Years of the 20th century in Laos
Laos
1970s in Laos
Laos